The Ottoman Tobacco Company, also known as the Régie Company for its French official name Société de la régie co-intéressée des tabacs de l'empire Ottoman, was a parastatal company or Regie formed in the later Ottoman Empire by the Ottoman Public Debt Administration, with backing from a consortium of European banks. The company had a monopoly over tobacco production, and its revenue was intended to help overcome the Ottoman state's persistent shortage of income. The Ottoman Tobacco Company constituted the largest foreign investment in the Ottoman Empire, and it attempted to introduce more efficient production methods – against local resistance.

In 1881, the state monopoly on salt was incorporated into the Régie Company, which passed revenue from salt taxes (tuz resmi) to the Public Debt Commission. As the state (or a parallel state controlled by the government's creditors) now effectively controlled salt production and salt prices, salt smuggling became a problem. In 1884, the Ottoman government instituted a tobacco monopoly and delegated it to a partly foreign company, the “Regie co-intr$éressée des tabacs de l’Empire ottoman”, which relies on a consortium of European banks and on the Imperial Ottoman Bank, also listed in London and Paris. Founded in 1863, the latter brought together French shareholders supplementing initial contributions of British funds in 1856. Both had offices in Paris, Place de la Bourse. 

Under the Republic of Turkey, the Ottoman Tobacco Company was nationalised in 1925 and became Tekel, which was sold to British American Tobacco in 2008.

There are successor companies in other Ottoman successor states. To this day, the state-run tobacco monopolies in Lebanon and Syria are known as Régie.

See also
 Ottoman Bank

References

Taxation in the Ottoman Empire
Tobacco companies of Turkey
Tobacco taxation